The name Trudy has been used for two tropical cyclones in the Eastern Pacific Ocean.

Hurricane Trudy (1990), a Category 4 hurricane that churned in the open ocean.
Tropical Storm Trudy (2014), a short-lived tropical storm that made landfall in Mexico.

Pacific hurricane set index articles